Alex 'Barney' McLure (1916-2005) was an Australian rugby league footballer who played in the 1940s.

Playing career
McLure featured only in the 1942 NSWRFL season for the St. George club. McLure was a noted Sydney domestic rugby union player that played for Gordon RFC that switched to Rugby League during the war years.

Death
McLure died on 15 March 2005 at Kingsgrove, New South Wales, age 88.

References

1916 births
2005 deaths
Australian rugby league players
Rugby league centres
Rugby league players from New South Wales
Rugby league wingers
St. George Dragons players